Mind, Body & Song is the second studio album by the American R&B trio Jade, released in 1994. The album produced two charting singles, "5-4-3-2 (Yo! Time Is Up)" which peaked at #72 on the US Billboard Hot 100, along with "Every Day of the Week" which peaked at #20.

Track listing 
"When Will I See You Again" (Di Reed, Joi Marshall, Tonya Kelly) (0:30)
"If the Mood Is Right" (Dave Hall, Gordon Chambers) (5:49)
"Bedroom" (John Howcott, Emmanel Officer, Donald Parks, Wendell Wellman, Tabitha Duncan) (5:04)
"If the Lovin' Ain't Good" (Dave Hall, Donell Jones) (5:12)
"5-4-3-2 (Yo! Time Is Up)" (Di Reed, Joi Marshall, Tonya Kelly, Mark Morales, Mark C. Rooney) (5:16)
"What's Goin' On" (Terrance Davis, Captain Curt, Di Reed, Joi Marshall, Tonya Kelly) (4:45)
"Hangin'" (Di Reed, Joi Marshall, Tonya Kelly, Reginald Heard) (3:59)
"Every Day of the Week" (Antonina Armato, Robert Jerald, Ken Miller) (5:15)
"Everything" (Emmanuel Dean, Laurneá Wilkerson) (4:18)
"Do You Want Me" (Louis Hinton) (4:59)
"I Like The Way" (Di Reed, Joi Marshall, Tonya Kelly, Mark Morales, Mark C. Rooney) (5:07)
"There's Not a Man" (Mark Jordan, Rashad Coes, John Howcott, Emmanuel Officer, Donald Parks) (4:10)
"It's On" (Mark Jordan, Rashad Coes, Di Reed, Joi Marshall, Tonya Kelly, John Howcott, Emmanuel Officer, Donald Parks) (4:08)
"Mind, Body & Song" (Di Reed, Joi Marshall, Tonya Kelly) (1:20)

References

1994 albums
Albums produced by Cory Rooney
Jade (American group) albums